Simon Kroon (born 16 June 1993) is a Swedish footballer who plays for Östersunds FK in Superettan. He is the son of the former athletes Johnny Kroon and Annika Lorentzon.

Club career
Kroon made his Allsvenskan debut in a match against Kalmar FF  on 20 June 2011. Seven days later he made his debut in the starting eleven in a match against GAIS at Gamla Ullevi. On 28 March 2013 Kroon signed a first team contract with Malmö FF until the end of the 2015 season. A few weeks later he scored his first league goal for Malmö FF in the home fixture against Östers IF to seal a 2–0 win for Malmö.

After having played 8 matches in his debut season at the club and then just one match during the 2012 season, Kroon was given a fair amount of playing time during the league title winning 2013 season. Although most his appearances was from the bench, Kroon played in 17 matches and scored 2 goals in the league. He also played in four matches and scored two goals for the club during qualification for the 2013–14 UEFA Europa League. In the 2014 season Kroon continued to make regular appearances for the club. In the group stage for the 2013–14 Svenska Cupen he scored five goals in three matches. He also scored for the club in the final fixture of the group stage of the 2014–15 UEFA Champions League, an away loss 4–2 to Olympiacos on 9 December 2014.

Career statistics

As of 21 July 2018.

Honours

Club
Malmö FF
 Allsvenskan: 2013, 2014
 Svenska Supercupen: 2013, 2014

References

External links
 Malmö FF profile 
 
 

1993 births
Living people
Swedish footballers
Sweden youth international footballers
Sweden under-21 international footballers
Footballers from Skåne County
IF Limhamn Bunkeflo (men) players
Malmö FF players
SønderjyskE Fodbold players
FC Midtjylland players
Östersunds FK players
Allsvenskan players
Danish Superliga players
Association football wingers